Crowned Unholy is the seventh studio album by Swedish melodic death metal band The Crown. It is a remake of the band's fifth studio album, Crowned in Terror, with re-recorded vocal tracks by Johan Lindstrand, re-recorded bass tracks by Magnus Olsfelt, a new version of the intro (originally written by guitarist Marko Tervonen) now programmed by drummer Janne Saarenpää, drum sound digitally enhanced by Janne, and synthesizer-enhanced parts, all programmed by Janne.

The album also contains a free DVD entitled The Crown Invades Karlsruhe, a professionally recorded show in Karlsruhe, Germany on 11 November 2003, while on tour performing Possessed 13.

Reception

In a March 2007 interview, The Crown frontman Johan Lindstrand was asked if he felt re-recording old tracks for the album was actually the right decision. "I think it was the wrong decision", revealed Lindstrand. "Having said that, it was also a chance for  diehard fans to have all the albums with me, the original singer, on all of them.

On 24 November 2003, The Crown  released a free DVD titled The Crown Invades Karlsruhe in Germany, which was a tie-in to the Crowned Unholy.

In 2018, The Crown  announced the re-issue of Crowned Unholy vinyls. The vinyls will be sold as either dead gold marbled, opaque golden yellow marbled, or clear cover with black marbled vinyl inside in the European Union and clear old gold marbled vinyl in the United States.

Tim Pigeon of Last Rites praised the songs such as "Death Metal Holocaust", "Under the Whip" and "Death is the Hunter" but criticized the band's inclusion of clean vocals for "The Speed of Darkness".

Track listing

CD

DVD

Personnel
The Crown
Marcus Sunesson - guitars
Johan Lindstrand - vocals
Marko Tervonen - guitars
Janne Saarenpää - drums, programming, synth
Magnus Olsfelt - bass

Production
Dragan Tanasković - engineering, mastering
Oliver Barth - filming (bonus DVD)
Snowy Shaw - photography
Mark Brand - cover art, layout
Tobias Basan - cover art, layout
Janne Saarenpää - engineering

References

The Crown (band) albums
2004 albums
Metal Blade Records albums